Ultrabook is a marketing term, originated and trademarked by Intel, for a category of high-end laptop computers. 

They were originally marketed as featuring ultra thin form factor and light weight design without compromising battery life or performance, and when the term was originated they generally were enough smaller than average laptop models to qualify as subnotebooks.

As ultrabook features became more mainstream in the mid-late 2010s, explicitly branding laptop models as ultrabooks became much less frequent.  As of 2021, while Intel maintains the Ultrabook trademark, it is rarely used for new models and has been superseded in Intel's own marketing by the Intel Evo branding.

History 
In 2011, Intel Capital press officer Jordan Balk Schaer announced a new fund to support startups working on technologies in line with the company's concept for next generation notebooks.  The company set aside a $300 million fund to be spent over the next three to four years in areas related to Ultrabooks. Intel announced the Ultrabook concept at Computex in 2011. The Ultrabook would be a thin (less than 0.8 inches thick) notebook that utilized Intel processors, and would emphasize portability and a longer battery life than other laptops By this marketing initiative and the associated $300 million fund, Intel hoped to influence the slumping PC market against rising competition from smartphones and tablet computers, which are typically powered by competing ARM-based processors.

Ultrabooks competed against other subnotebooks, including Apple’s MacBook Air, which has similar form specifications and was powered until 2020 by Intel CPUs, but was not advertised under the Ultrabook brand.

At the Intel Developer Forum in 2011, four Taiwan ODMs showed prototype Ultrabooks that used Intel's Ivy Bridge chips. Intel plans to reduce power consumption of its chips for Ultrabooks, like Ivy Bridge processors, which will feature 17 W default thermal design power.

At a presentation at the Consumer Electronics Show, an Intel manager stated that market analysis revealed that screen size motivated some of the reluctance to switch to 13" Ultrabooks. As a result, Intel planned to ensure, through cooperation with manufacturers, a 14 or 15-inch screen on 50% of the 75 Ultrabook models that would likely come to market in 2012.

IHS iSuppli had originally forecast that 22 million Ultrabooks would be shipped by the end of 2012, and 61 million would be shipped in 2013. By October 2012, IHS had revised its projections down significantly, to 10 million units sold in 2012 and 44 million for 2013.  Most Ultrabooks were too expensive for wide adoption. In addition Intel's constant changing of Ultrabook specifications caused confusion among consumers; and this was compounded by OEMs that released slim/"sleek" or "Sleekbook" laptops (e.g. Hewlett-Packard Pavilion TouchSmart 15z-b000 Sleekbook, Samsung Ativ Book 9 Lite) that are cheaper AMD-powered variants of their more expensive Intel-equipped Ultrabooks. Overall there was a shift in the market away from PCs as a whole (including Ultrabooks) and towards smartphones and tablet computers as the personal computing devices of choice.

Intel banked on the release of Windows 8 as well as new form factors, such as "convertible" laptops with touchscreens and tablets with keyboard docks ("detachable"), and features (accelerometers and gyroscopes for touchscreens, hand-gesture recognition) to build demand for Ultrabooks. With the third generation Ultrabook specification, introduced in June 2013 alongside its new Haswell  processor architecture, Intel also added the requirement for all future Ultrabooks to include touchscreens. The requirement, grounded in user experience research, was intended to prevent "game-playing" and market confusion from OEMs, who had offered low-end products with touchscreens but not Ultrabooks.

Specifications 
Intel required that manufacturers meet certain specifications to market a laptop as an Ultrabook. These requirements changed with each release of Intel's Centrino mobile platform.

List of models

References

External links

  .

 .
 .

American inventions
Intel products
 

sv:Ultrabook